Erik Rodriguez "EJ" Manuel Jr. (born March 19, 1990) is a former American football quarterback. He played college football at Florida State, leading the Seminoles to an ACC championship and Orange Bowl win in his senior year, and was drafted by the Buffalo Bills in the first round of the 2013 NFL Draft.

Drafted by the Bills to be their franchise quarterback, Manuel suffered several injuries and saw his on-the-field performance struggle. After starting 10 games in his rookie year and throwing for 1,972 yards and 11 touchdowns, Manuel made just a combined seven starts and threw eight touchdowns over the next three seasons, sitting behind Kyle Orton and Tyrod Taylor on the depth chart. After leaving the Bills, he then spent one year with the Oakland Raiders, sat out the 2018 season and signed with the Kansas City Chiefs in 2019 before retiring during the offseason that year.

Early life

Manuel was born in Virginia Beach, Virginia on March 19, 1990. He attended Bayside High School Virginia Beach, where he played for the Bayside Marlins high school football team. During his time with the Marlins, Manuel recorded nearly 7,400 yards and 68 touchdowns. He was considered a five-star recruit by Scout, a four star recruit by Rivals. He was an All-American quarterback in high school.

College career
Manuel enrolled in Florida State University, where he played for coach Bobby Bowden and coach Jimbo Fisher's Florida State Seminoles football teams from 2008 to 2012. While he was a student, he joined the Pi Kappa Alpha fraternity. Manuel became the second collegiate quarterback to win four straight bowl games, the first being Pat White of West Virginia (2005–2008).

2009 season
Manuel took over for an injured Christian Ponder as the 4–5 Seminoles were in danger of finishing with a losing record for the first time since Bobby Bowden took over the program. His first start was an away game against Wake Forest. He completed 15-of-20 passes for 220 yards with one touchdown, leading the Seminoles to a 41–28 win over Wake Forest, who at the time had won three games in a row against Florida State. Manuel struggled in his second game against Maryland but still managed to pull out a much needed win making FSU bowl-eligible. Manuel's struggles continued against the dominating Florida Gators, and the mobile quarterback was not able to get into a rhythm as Florida State lost, 37–10.

Florida State entered the Gator Bowl 6–6 and in serious danger of letting legendary coach Bobby Bowden leave with a losing record. Manuel led Florida State to a 33–21 victory over the West Virginia Mountaineers and won the Gator Bowl MVP honors.

2010 season
Manuel started twice in the 2010 season in relief of Christian Ponder, who battled a nagging forearm injury. In his first start against Clemson, he picked up 71 yards on 15 carries. He also led the Seminoles to a victory in the 2010 Chick-fil-A Bowl against South Carolina in relief of Christian Ponder, who was injured in the second quarter of the game.

2011 season
In the 2011 season, Manuel played in every game besides the loss at Clemson after injuring his shoulder in a loss against Oklahoma the previous week. He finished the season with 2,666 yards passing on a 65% completion rate. He also finished with 18 passing touchdowns, four rushing touchdowns, and eight interceptions. He helped lead the Seminoles to a comeback win against the Notre Dame Fighting Irish in the Champs Sports Bowl by throwing for 249 yards and two touchdowns.

2012 season
In the 2012 season, Manuel led the Seminoles to numerous wins over ACC rivals, an ACC Championship, and an Orange Bowl win against Northern Illinois for a 12–2 record in his senior season.

Collegiate legacy
Manuel led the Seminoles to a 12-win season for just the third time in program history and the first time since their dominant stretch in the 1990s. During his senior season, he threw for the second most yards in team history with 3,392, trailing only Chris Weinke's Heisman Trophy winning season, in which Weinke threw for 4,167 yards. Manuel went 25–6 as a starter, won the first BCS bowl for Florida State since 2000, won five out of six games against intrastate rivals Miami and Florida, and he led the offense to its most prolific season in team history, cleanly surpassing the 1999 National Championship squad with 6,591 yards.

College statistics

Professional career
NFL.com analyst Bucky Brooks projected him as a top five quarterback heading into the 2013 Draft and compared him to Josh Freeman.  While Manuel possessed the blue-chip physical characteristics, work ethic, and leadership qualities necessary to be successful at the NFL level, he was faulted for somewhat inconsistent play at times during his college career.

Buffalo Bills
Manuel was selected by the Buffalo Bills in the first round with the 16th overall pick in the 2013 NFL Draft. He was the only quarterback taken in the first round of the draft, a draft that was seen as especially thin at quarterback; the Bills, who originally drafted eighth and had a great need for a quarterback, even traded down to obtain more picks.

2013 season

On June 14, 2013, Manuel signed a four-year contract with the Buffalo Bills. The deal was worth a fully guaranteed $8.88 million, including a signing bonus of $4.85 million evenly spaced out annually ($1.2 million) over the next four years. His salary in 2013 was $1.6 million, $2.0 million in 2014, $2.4 million in 2015, and $2.8 million in 2016.

Manuel underwent an operation on his knee to remove fluid buildup after the second game of the preseason and it was unsure if he would be ready to start the season-opener. On September 4, 2013, head coach Doug Marrone announced at the team meeting that Manuel was confirmed to be the starter for Week 1. In the season opener, Manuel completed his first NFL touchdown to fellow rookie Robert Woods, on an 18-yard completion. On September 15, Manuel engineered his first fourth-quarter comeback, with a nine-play, 80-yard touchdown march to bring his team from a six-point deficit in the fourth quarter with seconds left in the game. The Buffalo Bills went on to win in a Week 2 game against the Carolina Panthers by a score of 24–23. Manuel was voted the "Pepsi Next NFL Rookie of the Week" for his performance.

On October 3, 2013, during the third quarter against the Cleveland Browns, Manuel sprained his right lateral collateral ligament, causing him to miss the next five weeks of his rookie season. Manuel had an up and down first year, but was given a vote of confidence by coach Doug Marrone as he was announced as the starting quarterback for the 2014 season. In 10 games of his rookie year in 2013, Manuel had 1,972 passing yards with 11 touchdowns and 9 interceptions. In addition, he rushed for 186 yards with two rushing touchdowns.

2014 season

On September 28, 2014, in a game against the Houston Texans, one of Manuel's passes was intercepted by All-Pro defensive end J. J. Watt and returned 80 yards for a touchdown. The next day, he was benched in favor of veteran quarterback Kyle Orton after starting the first four games of the 2014 season and bringing the Bills to a 2–2 record. Manuel finished the 2014 with 838 yards, 5 touchdowns, 3 interceptions, and a career-high passer rating of 80.3. Orton would win seven of the next 12 games, finishing the Bills 2014 season with a 9–7 record, the first time the Bills had posted a winning record since 2004.

2015 season
After posting the franchise's first winning record in a decade, Orton retired and Marrone opted out of the rest of his contract. The Bills then hired former division rival Rex Ryan as head coach. Manuel competed with free agent acquisition Tyrod Taylor and trade acquisition Matt Cassel for the starting quarterback job. During mini-camp, Manuel struggled to compete for the starting job and was listed as the third-string quarterback on the depth chart. Manuel performed well in the third preseason game, completing nearly all of his passes, showing improved accuracy. On August 31, 2015, coach Rex Ryan announced that Manuel and Cassel had lost the starting job to Taylor.

Manuel made his first start in over a year in Week 6 against the undefeated Cincinnati Bengals in place of an injured Tyrod Taylor, who suffered an MCL injury the previous week. On the first drive of the game for the Bills against the Bengals, he led the Bills 80 yards down the field for a touchdown. Manuel finished 28-42 for 263 passing yards, a passing touchdown, one rushing touchdown and an interception in the 34–21 loss.

Against the Jacksonville Jaguars on October 25 in London, Manuel threw for 298 yards and two touchdowns but had three costly turnovers, two of which were returned directly for scores in the second quarter. He rallied the Bills from 24 points down to take the lead in the fourth quarter. However, Jacksonville regained the lead with a Blake Bortles touchdown pass to wide receiver Allen Hurns, sealing the win 34–31 as the Bills were unable to respond. With the loss, Manuel became the first quarterback in NFL history to lose a game in three countries (United States, Canada, and England).

2016 season

On May 2, 2016, it was announced that the Bills declined to exercise Manuel's fifth-year option for the 2017 season. He would see spot duty through the first part of the 2016 season, usually as parts of trick plays. With the Bills being out of playoff contention, Manuel started the final game of the regular season due to Tyrod Taylor being inactive. Manuel completed 9 of 20 passes for 86 yards before being benched for rookie quarterback Cardale Jones to start the fourth quarter.

Oakland Raiders

2017 season
On March 20, 2017, Manuel signed a one-year contract with the Oakland Raiders. During Week 4 game against the Denver Broncos, Derek Carr suffered a back injury in the third quarter and was relieved by Manuel, who completed 11 of 17 passes for 106 yards and an interception as the Raiders lost by a score of 16–10. Due to Carr's injury, Manuel started the Week 5 game against the Baltimore Ravens, completing 13 of 26 passes for 159 yards and a touchdown as the Raiders lost by a score of 30–17. With the Raiders' loss to the New England Patriots on November 19 in Mexico City, Manuel became the first quarterback in NFL history to be on a team that would lose a game in four different countries (United States, Canada, England, and Mexico).

2018 season
On March 22, 2018, Manuel re-signed with the Raiders. On September 1, 2018, he was released.

Kansas City Chiefs
On February 22, 2019, Manuel was signed by the Kansas City Chiefs.

Retirement
On May 13, 2019, Manuel announced his retirement. Shortly after, he announced that he would be joining the ACC Network as a college football analyst.

NFL career statistics

Bills franchise records 
 Most passing touchdowns by a rookie quarterback: 11
 Most completions by a rookie quarterback: 180
 Highest completion percentage by a rookie quarterback: 58.8
 Best rookie passer rating, minimum 7 appearances: 77.7

Source:

Personal stock offering
It was reported that Manuel would be offering stock in his future earnings via a venture with Fantex, Inc. as part of a new financial instrument being sold by Fantex. He planned to offer a 10% share of all future earnings from his brand to Fantex, which would then turn around and divide it into shares of a publicly traded tracking stock.

In July 2014, the Manuel/Fantex stock offering was completed. 523,700 shares were sold, valued at $10 per share.

References

External links

Florida State Seminoles bio

1990 births
Living people
African-American players of American football
American football quarterbacks
Buffalo Bills players
Florida State Seminoles football players
Kansas City Chiefs players
Oakland Raiders players
Players of American football from Virginia
Sportspeople from Virginia Beach, Virginia
Under Armour All-American football players
21st-century African-American sportspeople